John Dowgray (6 June 1873–28 January 1950) was a New Zealand coalminer, trade unionist and bank director. He was born in Bothwell, Lanarkshire, Scotland on 6 June 1873.

References

1873 births
1950 deaths
New Zealand trade unionists
Scottish emigrants to New Zealand
New Zealand coal miners
Social Democratic Party (New Zealand) politicians
New Zealand Labour Party politicians